Yankton County is a county in the U.S. state of South Dakota. As of the 2020 United States Census, the population was 23,310. Its county seat is Yankton. Yankton County comprises the Yankton, SD Micropolitan Statistical Area.

Geography

Yankton County lies on the south side of South Dakota. Its south boundary line abuts the north boundary line of the state of Nebraska (across the Missouri River). The Missouri flows eastward along the county's south border. The James River flows south-southeastward through the west central portion of the county, discharging into the Missouri near the midpoint of the county's south line. The county terrain consists of rolling hills, carved by creeks and drainages, hosting several lakes and ponds. The area is devoted to agriculture. The terrain slopes to the south and the east. Its highest point is 1,473' (449m) ASL, on the eastern portion of its north boundary line.

Lewis & Clark Lake, a popular regional tourist and recreational destination is found in the southwestern part of the county.

Major highways

 U.S. Highway 81
 South Dakota Highway 46
 South Dakota Highway 50
 South Dakota Highway 52
 South Dakota Highway 153
 South Dakota Highway 314

Airports
Chan Gurney Municipal Airport

Adjacent counties

 Turner County - northeast
 Clay County - east
 Cedar County, Nebraska - southeast
 Knox County, Nebraska - southwest
 Bon Homme County - west
 Hutchinson County - northwest

Protected areas

 Chief White Crane State Recreation Area
 Dakota Territorial Capitol Building/Riverside Park
 Diede Waterfowl Production Area
 Edelman Waterfowl Production Area
 Gavins Point National Fish Hatchery
 Hansen Waterfowl Production Area
 Lewis & Clark State Recreation Area
 Missouri National Recreational River (part)
 Pierson Ranch State Recreation Area

Lakes and Reservoirs

 Beaver Lake
 Guthmiller Lake
 Lake Yankton
 Lewis and Clark Lake (part)
 Marindahl Lake

Demographics

2000 census
As of the 2000 United States Census, there were 21,652 people, 8,187 households, and 5,403 families in the county. The population density was 42 people per square mile (16/km2). There were 8,840 housing units at an average density of 17 per square mile (7/km2). The racial makeup of the county is 95.10% White, 1.16% African American, 1.63% Native American, 0.42% Asian, 0.02% Pacific Islander, 0.74% from other races, and 0.91% from two or more races. 1.82% of the population are Hispanic or Latino of any race.

There were 8,187 households, out of which 33.00% had children under the age of 18 living with them, 54.40% were married couples living together, 8.30% had a female householder with no husband present, and 34.00% were non-families. 29.30% of all households were made up of individuals, and 12.00% had someone living alone who was 65 years of age or older. The average household size was 2.43 and the average family size was 3.03.

The county population contained 25.70% under the age of 18, 8.70% from 18 to 24, 29.00% from 25 to 44, 22.00% from 45 to 64, and 14.60% who were 65 years of age or older. The median age was 37 years. For every 100 females there were 101.90 males. For every 100 females age 18 and over, there were 101.30 males.

The median income for a household in the county was $35,374, and the median income for a family was $43,600. Males had a median income of $29,010 versus $20,686 for females. The per capita income for the county was $17,312. About 6.60% of families and 9.60% of the population were below the poverty line, including 10.00% of those under age 18 and 9.00% of those age 65 or over.

2010 census
As of the 2010 United States Census, there were 22,438 people, 8,770 households, and 5,476 families in the county. The racial makeup of the county was 92.8% white, 2.5% American Indian, 1.5% black or African American, 0.5% Asian, 1.1% from other races, and 1.4% from two or more races. Those of Hispanic or Latino origin made up 2.7% of the population. In terms of ancestry,

Of the 8,770 households, 29.2% had children under the age of 18 living with them, 50.1% were married couples living together, 8.8% had a female householder with no husband present, 37.6% were non-families, and 32.0% of all households were made up of individuals. The average household size was 2.30 and the average family size was 2.90. The median age was 41.3 years.

The median income for a household in the county was $47,124 and the median income for a family was $62,070. Males had a median income of $37,637 versus $29,488 for females. The per capita income for the county was $24,776. About 5.0% of families and 11.2% of the population were below the poverty line, including 10.7% of those under age 18 and 13.5% of those age 65 or over.

Communities

Cities
 Irene (partial)
 Yankton (county seat)

Towns

 Gayville
 Lesterville
 Mission Hill
 Utica
 Volin

Census-designated place 
Jamesville Colony

Townships

 Gayville
 Jamesville
 Marindahl
 Mayfield
 Mission Hill
 Turkey Valley
 Utica
 Volin
 Walshtown

Unorganized territories
 Southeast Yankton
 West Yankton

Politics and government
Yankton County is Governed by the County Commission, a five-member legislative body elected at-large. The current commissioners are:
 Dan Klimisch, Chairman 
 Cheri Loest, Vice Chairman 
 Don Kettering
 Joe Healy 
 Gary Swensen

The county is located in South Dakota Legislative District 18. As of 2019, Yankton County is represented in the South Dakota Senate by Senator Craig Kennedy-(D), and in the South Dakota House of Representatives by State Representatives Jean Hunhoff-(R) and Ryan Cwach-(D). The county is located in South Dakota's At-Large Congressional District, currently held by Republican Dusty Johnson.

In national elections, Yankton County voters have been reliably Republican for several decades. In no national election since 1964 has the county selected the Democratic Party candidate.

The Yankton County Sheriff's Office provides law enforcement in the county and operates the 120-bed county jail.  the current Sheriff is James "Jim" C. Vlahakis.

Recreation and Tourism
Lewis and Clark Lake is located in southwestern Yankton County, four miles (6 km) west of Yankton. The Lewis & Clark Lake area is a popular regional tourist and recreation destination with parks, trails, campgrounds, boat ramps, and marinas. Gavins Point Dam, which creates Lewis & Clark Lake, is a popular fishing destination on the Missouri River. The South Dakota Department of Game, Fish, and Parks operates the Lewis & Clark State Recreation Area on the northern shore of the lake.

Below Gavins Point Dam, the Missouri National Recreational River is home to one of the few non-channelized portions of the "Big Muddy", and is popular with birdwatchers, hunters, canoers, and kayakers.

See also
 National Register of Historic Places listings in Yankton County, South Dakota

References

External links

Yankton County (Official website)
U.S. Census Data - Yankton County

 
South Dakota placenames of Native American origin
South Dakota counties on the Missouri River
1862 establishments in Dakota Territory
Populated places established in 1862